Lukas Grill (born 19 November 1991) is an Austrian footballer who currently plays as a midfielder for SV Gloggnitz.

External links

1991 births
Living people
Austrian footballers
SC Austria Lustenau players
Wiener Sport-Club players
Floridsdorfer AC players
Kremser SC players
2. Liga (Austria) players
Association football midfielders